Astrothelium inspersogalbineum is a species of corticolous (bark-dwelling), crustose lichen in the family Trypetheliaceae. Found in Singapore, it was formally described as a new species in 2016 by lichenologists André Aptroot and Gothamie Weerakoon. The type specimen was collected by the second author in a rainforest, where it was found growing on smooth bark. The lichen has a smooth and somewhat shiny, pale greenish-grey thallus with a cortex and a thin (0.2 mm wide) black prothallus line. A yellow to orange anthraquinone was the only lichen product detected in the collected specimens using thin-layer chromatography. A. inspersogalbineum also contains the compound lichexanthone, which causes the thallus to fluoresce yellow when lit with a long-wavelength UV light. The main characteristics of the lichen distinguishing it from others in Astrothelium are its inspersed hamathecium; its ascospores, with dimensions of 20–25 by 9–11 μm; and the grouping of its ascomata, which can fuse together to become irregularly confluent.

References

inspersogalbineum
Lichen species
Lichens described in 2016
Lichens of Malesia
Taxa named by André Aptroot
Taxa named by Gothamie Weerakoon